Hanlon was a shipyard in Oakland Inner Harbor on the north bank of the Oakland Estuary at the foot of 5th Ave. In 1919 the site had 5 slipways and occupied 13 acres.

Founded in 1910, the yard produced a few barges and the cargo ships Bacchus and Joplin for the Herules Powder Company as well as 11 cargo ships for the United States Shipping Board, with 2 being requisitions and 9 built under contract. Hanlon was the sole producer of Design 1043 ships.

 Governor John Lind, Major Wheeler in 1918 (all dates are delivery dates)
 9 of 9 Design 1043 ships
 Delfina, Delisle in 1918
 Dellwood, Delrosa, Depere, Derblay, Jeptha (Denall), Medon in 1920
 Memnon in 1921

In 1928 the yard was bought by the nearby General Engineering & Dry Dock Company, in 1940 the Hurley Marine Shipyard repair facility operated on the site.

See Also

 Moore Dry Dock Company#Shipbuilding in Oakland and Alameda
 A. H. Bull Steamship Company#Baltimore Insular Line Inc. ships - John Lind, Major Wheeler, Delfina, Delisle

References

Shipbuilding companies of California
Defunct shipbuilding companies of the United States
Manufacturing companies based in Oakland, California
History of Oakland, California
Defunct companies based in the San Francisco Bay Area
Defunct manufacturing companies based in California
Shipyards in California